Claire Buffie (born May 15, 1986), is an American photographer. As Miss New York 2010, she was the first Miss America contestant to advocate a gay-rights platform at the Miss America 2011 pageant (where she placed in the top 12).

Background
A BSU Presidential Scholar and Emens scholar, Buffie earned a Bachelor of Fine Arts degree in visual communications from Ball State University in 2008, with a concentration in photography and a minor in dance performance. During her academic career she received numerous awards and honors. After interning with Lois Greenfield and Macfadden Publications (publisher of Dance Magazine and Pointe), she began designing professionally for movmnt magazine. She has owned and operated her own photography and design business since 2005. She began working for Apple Inc. in 2010.

Buffie competed in the Miss Indiana 2008 contest, earning second runner-up to Miss Indiana 2008 winner, Katie Stam (Miss America 2009), and was a preliminary swimsuit and interview winner. After moving to New York, she competed in Miss New York 2009 pageant, winning preliminary swimsuit, evening gown and overall interview. The next year, she was crowned Miss Southeast New York, and won the Miss New York 2010 title with the platform "Straight for Equality: Let's Talk".

Buffie is the writer of a children's poem book called Babies, Biscuits, Bears, and Seashore Fun, and an active volunteer in New York's Safe Schools Program, which helps schools reduce bullying and harassment based on sexual orientation and gender identity.

References

External links

 

Living people
1986 births
Miss America 2011 delegates
American LGBT rights activists
Ball State University alumni
American beauty pageant winners
21st-century American photographers
American women graphic designers
Artists from Indianapolis
Artists from New York City
American women photographers
Miss New York winners
Apple Inc. employees
American women poets
21st-century American women writers
21st-century American poets
American women children's writers